"Les derniers seront les premiers" is a French-language pop song by Canadian singer Celine Dion, recorded for her album, D'eux (1995). It was written by Jean-Jacques Goldman, who also did the backing vocals. In November 1996, "Les derniers seront les premiers" was released as a promotional single in Europe and Canada from Dion's live album, Live à Paris (1996). It was performed as a live duet with Goldman.
Dion performed the song during her 1995 D'eux Tour and during the French shows of her 1996/1997 Falling Into You: Around the World tour.

Music video
The music video was taken from the concert in Zenith Theatre, Paris. It can be found on the Live à Paris DVD.

Commercial performance
"Les derniers seront les premiers" peaked at number 3 on the Quebec Airplay Chart, entering it on 16 November 1996 and spending 35 weeks there in total. It reached also number 47 on the Belgian Wallonia Airplay Chart.

Formats and track listings
Canadian/European promotional CD single
"Les derniers seront les premiers" (Live) – 3:48

Charts

References

1995 songs
1996 singles
Celine Dion songs
French-language songs
Live singles
Songs written by Jean-Jacques Goldman
Male–female vocal duets